Stair Quest is a non-commercial "adventure" game serving as an homage to Sierra's King's Quest series and similar games, originally released in 2016.

Development
Stair Quest was originally developed in two weeks as an entry in the 2016 Adventure Jam. A Special Edition, with added rooms, improved animation, and fixed bugs was released on 9 January 2017.

Reception
Stair Quest was nominated for five AGS Awards for 2016, including Best Gameplay and Best Short Game.
Luke Plunkett of Kotaku described it as an "80s gaming nightmare".
William Hughes of The A.V. Club coined the term "frustalgia" to characterize Stair Quest and said "there are worse ways to spend 10 minutes of your life".
For Siliconera, Joel Couture said that Stair Quest had "a humorous, if vicious, focus on how frustrating" parts of the old-school adventure games could be, and calls it a "maddening, yet lighthearted adventure of stairs and gaming history".

References

External links
GameJolt page
YouTube trailer
AGS Game Profile

2016 video games
Adventure games
Adventure Game Studio games
Indie video games
Linux games
MacOS games
Windows games